is a Fukui Railway Fukubu Line railway station located in the city of Sabae, Fukui Prefecture, Japan.

Lines

Station layout
The station consists of two ground-level opposed side platforms connected by a level crossing. The station is staffed.

Adjacent stations

History
The station opened on February 23, 1924. The original wooden station building was replaced by concrete structure in September 1995.

Passenger statistics
In fiscal 2015, the station was used by an average of 348 passengers daily (boarding passengers only).

Surrounding area
There is a taxi stand and a Sabae Community Bus stop outside the station's north exit.
Directly across the street is the Sabae City Hotel.
To the north (uphill): Nishiyama Zoo and Nishiyama Park. 
Sabae Station on the JR West Hokuriku Main Line is located approximately 800 meters to the east.

See also
 List of railway stations in Japan

References

External links

  

Railway stations in Fukui Prefecture
Railway stations in Japan opened in 1924
Fukui Railway Fukubu Line
Sabae, Fukui